Flare-Up Sal is a surviving 1918 American silent drama film directed by Roy William Neill and starring Dorothy Dalton.  Thomas H. Ince produced and released through Paramount Pictures.

Cast
Dorothy Dalton as Flare-Up Sal
Thurston Hall as The Red Rider
William Conklin as Dandy Dave Hammond
J. P. Lockney as Tin Cup Casey
Milton Ross as Lige Higbee

unbilled
Frank Daniels
Kelson Falkenberg
Burton Halbert
Roy William Neill
Catherine Proudfit

Preservation status
A print of Flare-Up Sal is preserved in the Library of Congress collection.

References

External links

1918 films
American silent feature films
Films directed by Roy William Neill
Paramount Pictures films
American black-and-white films
Silent American drama films
1918 drama films
1910s American films